Bogskär Lighthouse is located on the Bogskär skerries of Åland.

History
The lighthouse was constructed in the 1870s and was completed in 1882, on Sweden's initiative. Of steel construction, it was erected on a three-metre granite plinth. The red-painted  lighthouse had seven floors.

The lighthouse had a crew of nine, of which half were occupying the lighthouse at a time.

The lighthouse was damaged in a storm during the winter of 1889. In an 1894 repair, it was strengthened and to add weight, the space between its inner and outer shells was filled in with concrete up to the third floor.

In 1905, a wireless telegraph was installed, replacing the previous communication via light signals to passing ships.

In the First World War, a German warship destroyed the original lighthouse.

A new automated lighthouse was constructed in 1922 on concrete pillars. The lighthouse was restored in 1981, when it was equipped with a helipad. The lighthouse is now painted blue-white and is solar-powered.

See also 

 List of lighthouses in Åland
 Suomen leijona

References

Lighthouses completed in 1882
Lighthouses completed in 1922
Lighthouses in Finland